Matthew Bogusz (born November 14, 1986) is former Mayor of Des Plaines, Illinois, serving from 2013 to 2021 .

Early life and education 
Bogusz was born on November 14, 1986, in Des Plaines, Illinois. He attended Notre Dame College Prep in Niles, Illinois and Northwestern University, graduating in 2008.

Political career 

In 2009, Bogusz, was elected a City of Des Plaines Alderman of the 3rd ward.  While an alderman, Bogusz was variously chairman of the Des Plaines Finance and Administration Committee. He also served on the Public Works Committee and the Legal and Licensing Committee.

Bogusz was elected the Mayor of the City of Des Plaines on April 9, 2013. He received 55% of the vote in a three-way race. Bogusz became the youngest mayor in Des Plaines's history.  He was elected to a second term on April 4, 2017, receiving 63% of the vote.

In 2014, Des Plaines budgeted nearly $22 million in capital improvements as well as starting a "Curb Appeal Challenge" for residences and business to increase the city's quality of life. Crain's Chicago Business distinguished Bogusz as a member of their 2014 "Twenty in their 20s" class.  Bogusz relocated out of Des Plaines following the end of his term as Mayor.

References 

1986 births
Living people
Northwestern University alumni
Mayors of places in Illinois